Connor McDonald (born 15 April 1994) is a Scottish professional footballer.

Career

Livingston
A member of Livingston's under 19 squad, McDonald was promoted to the first team on 24 March 2012, where he was an unused substitute in a win over Falkirk. He was an unused substitute on one further occasion, before making his debut aged 17 as an early substitute on 7 April 2012 against Ross County. He made his first start for the club the early following season in Scottish Challenge Cup match against Annan Athletic on 28 July 2012, before then making his first league start on 25 August 2012 in a 0–0 draw against Raith Rovers at Starks Park.

In May 2020, McDonald signed for Edinburgh South until 2021.

Career statistics

References

External links 
 

1994 births
Living people
Scottish footballers
Association football midfielders
Livingston F.C. players
Scottish Football League players
Tynecastle F.C. players
Scottish Professional Football League players
Footballers from Edinburgh